False or falsehood may refer to:
False (logic), the negation of truth in classical logic
Lie or falsehood, a type of deception in the form of an untruthful statement
false (Unix), a Unix command
False (album), a 1992 album by Gorefest
Matthew Dear or False (born 1979), American DJ and producer
Falsehood (1952 film), an Italian melodrama film
Falsehood (2001 film), an American short film

See also

Anrita, falsehood in Hindu mythology